The Bylot Sound is a sound in the North Star Bay, Avannaata municipality, northwest Greenland.

Geography
This channel separates Saunders Island and Wolstenholme Island from the Greenland mainland. There is a tombolo named Uummannaq on the mainland shore at the eastern end of the sound by the former settlement of Pituffik.

History
This strait was named after 17th-century English navigator Robert Bylot, who led two expeditions to find the Northwest Passage. 

In the winter of 1849–1850 under Commander James Saunders of  got frozen-in in the sound during an Arctic expedition to search and resupply Captain Sir James Clark Ross' venture, who in turn had sailed in 1848 trying to locate the whereabouts of Sir John Franklin's expedition. While his ship was trapped by ice Commander Saunders named numerous landmarks in that area. 

In 1968 a B-52 bomber carrying four thermonuclear bombs crashed in the ice of the Bylot Sound spreading contaminated material over the whole sector.

The abandoned Inuit settlements of Narsaarsuk and Pituffik were located on the shores of the sound. Thule Air Base is currently the only inhabited place in the area.

References

External links 
 Explanatory notes to the Geological map of Greenland

Sounds of North America
Straits of Greenland
Bodies of water of Baffin Bay